Längtan was released on 29 July 2009, and is a Scotts studio album. On 7 August 2009, the album topped the Swedish albums chart only to have sold over 20 000 copies circa two weeks later, leading to the band being awarded a golden record.

The song Underbar charted at Svensktoppen for two weeks between 23-30 August 2009.

Track listing

Personnel
 Henrik Strömberg - vocals, guitar
 Claes Linder - keyboard, choir
 Roberto Mårdstam - bass, choir
 Per-Erik "Lillen" Tagesson - drums
 Production and arrangement: Roberto Mårdstam, Claes Linder
 Song producer/Choir arrangement: Henrik Sethsson
 Wind arrangement: Tore Berglund
 Mixed by: Plec i Panicroom
 Engineers: Plec och Andreas Rickstrand
 Sax: Martin Lindqvist, Tore Berglund
 Trumpet: Kart Olandersson, Johan Lindeborg
 Photo: Karin Törnblom
 Graphic form: R & R Reproduktion.se

Charts

Weekly charts

Year-end charts

References 

2009 albums
Scotts (band) albums